Yeşilyayla can refer to:

 Yeşilyayla, Çameli
 Yeşilyayla, Çaycuma
 Yeşilyayla, Çelikhan
 Yeşilyayla, Çorum
 Yeşilyayla, Gümüşova
 Yeşilyayla, Kemaliye
 Yeşilyayla, Korkuteli
 Yeşilyayla, Tercan
 Yeşilyayla, Yapraklı